The Luxembourg national handball team is the national team of Luxembourg. It takes part in international handball competitions.

The team participated at the 1958 World Men's Handball Championship, where they placed 16th.

Competitive record

World Championships

IHF Emerging Nations Championship
2017 – 7th place

Current roster

References

External links

IHF profile

Handball
Men's national handball teams